Robert H. Mohlenbrock (born September 26, 1931) is an American botanist and author. Mohlenbrock is an authority on the plants of Illinois, with expertise in floristics, plant taxonomy, endangered species, and wetland flora.

Early life and education
Mohlenbrock began his studies of the flora of southern Illinois at an early age. During childhood walks in the woods and along the banks of the Big Muddy River, he recalls mentally noting the diverse flora and fauna around Murphysboro, Illinois. He names his greatest influence to be his high school biology teacher, Esther Smith. At Murphysboro High School, Smith led excursions to high quality natural areas and encouraged her students to work on natural history projects that yielded valuable contributions to the knowledge of Illinois flora and fauna. Mohlenbrock has described her as "a dedicated soul, a serious scientist who would provide for those who were serious." Mohlenbrock's first project was presented at a 1948 science fair, called "Field Survey of Trees" of southern Illinois, completed with Kenneth Stewart. At least 7 students in Smith's classes, including Mohlenbrock and Kenneth Stewart, went on to attain PhDs in biology.

Mohlenbrock received both his bachelor's and master's degrees from Southern Illinois University Carbondale (SIU). As a master's student under John W. Voigt, he completed his thesis on "The vegetation of Giant City State Park: a floristic and ecological study" in 1954. Between 1956 and 1957, Mohlenbrock was briefly a research chemist for Pressite Engineering Co. in St. Louis, Missouri. He completed his PhD in 1957 at Washington University. His PhD thesis was titled "A revision of the genus Stylosanthes" (a genus in the legume family).

Career
Soon following the completion of his PhD work, Mohlenbrock was hired at Southern Illinois University Carbondale to fill in for a single quarter for a faculty member who had taken an unexpected leave. The faculty member never returned, launching Mohlenbrock's long career as a botanist at SIU. He stayed at SIU for 33 years until his retirement in 1990, having served as chair of the botany department for 16 years. He was also curator of the SIU herbarium between 1960 and 1965. Mohlenbrock's department at SIU provided one of the few places in the country that encouraged students to conduct floristic studies in pursuit of a PhD. Mohlenbrock advised 90 graduate students during his tenure at SIU and has received numerous awards in recognition of his instruction. In 1985 he was named Chairman of the North American Plant Specialists Group of the Species Survival Commission of the International Union for the Conservation of Nature, a position he held for 15 years. He is the author of 69 books about plants.

Mohlenbrock has consulted for many organizations including the Soil Conservation Service, U.S. Army Corps of Engineers, Illinois Nature Preserves Commission, and U.S. Forest Service. Since retirement, he has continued to teach wetland plant identification and other courses throughout the United States under his consulting company, Biotic Consultants (in partnership with his wife, Beverly A. Mohlenbrock). He has taught 328 of these week-long wetland plant classes in 32 states.

Legacy
In the 1960s and 70s, Mohlenbrock and Voigt continued their studies of southern Illinois to develop a conservation program for its natural areas. Through their surveys, they found that all of the bald cypress swamps in the area, with the exception of Horseshoe Lake, were privately owned. The land was primarily owned by a lumber company called Main Brothers, which had only left the land unlogged because the water had been too deep to drain. Partnerships between the state of Illinois, the Natural Land Institute of Rockford, and the Illinois chapter of the Nature Conservancy led to the purchase and protection of many of these remnant areas. The protected areas include Heron Pond – Little Black Slough Nature Preserve, a designated National Natural Landmark and wetland of international importance.

In 1982, with his son Mark W. Mohlenbrock, he co-founded the Southern Illinois Native Plant Society, an organization dedicated to "the preservation, conservation, and study of the native plants and vegetation of Southern Illinois." In 1986, it expanded to become a state-wide organization, now known as the Illinois Native Plant Society, with 7 active chapters, including the Southern Chapter.

Selected publications

Mohlenbrock has published numerous technical reports as well as articles in popular magazines such as Outdoor Illinois and a regular column in Natural History magazine called This Land since 1984. Below is a selected listing of his published books.

 with 
  *though apparently written by Mohlenbrock
 with 
  
  
  
  
  
  
 with 
  
  
 with

References

American botanical writers
American conservationists
American non-fiction environmental writers
American taxonomists
American male non-fiction writers
1931 births
Botanists active in North America
20th-century American botanists
21st-century American botanists
20th-century male writers
Scientists from Illinois
Southern Illinois University alumni
Washington University in St. Louis alumni
Southern Illinois University faculty
Living people